Margaret Masterton or Maistertoun was employed in 1594 at Stirling Castle as the nurse of Prince Henry, the son of James VI and I and Anne of Denmark.

She was a daughter of Janet Couston and Alexander Masterton of Bad in Perthshire, Masterton near Dunfermline, and Parkmill in Clackmannanshire.

She married a lawyer, James Primrose of Barhill, Culross. He kept a record of his legal work, known as a "Protocol Book", which is preserved by the National Records of Scotland. She was sometimes known as "Mistress Primrose" and received annuity payments from Prince Henry under that name. Their son George Primrose was a clergyman at Hereford Cathedral and preacher at the Eignbrook Chapel in 1662.

She may have been the wet-nurse to the Prince described by George Nicholson who became ill and was replaced in January 1595 by the wife of Henry Murray, a Stirling burgess. The baby would not feed unless his first nurse was present.

References 

People of Stirling Castle
Court of James VI and I
16th-century Scottish women
Royal nurses